The Alfa Romeo 800 is an Italian heavy truck produced by Alfa Romeo between 1940 and 1947. It was first produced as a military version 800RE and after the war as a civilian version. The military version was initially used only in the Italian Army ("Regio Esercito"), mainly in North Africa, Russia and occupied France. There were also gas generator and gasoline models produced. A half track prototype version a CSEM 800RE (Centro Studi ed Esperienze della Motorizzazione - the Italian Army's vehicle research and development organization) was also made for Italian army. Some of 800RE were also converted to German Army as Maultier, this vehicle had also tracks in rear.
 
The 800 was replaced by the model 900. All the series was then replaced by the slightly lighter Alfa Romeo Romeo, that served as the company's only commercial vehicle for decades to come.

Alfa Romeo 900 
The Alfa Romeo 900 is a truck produced by Alfa Romeo from 1947 to 1954. As a line, the model was virtually identical to the Alfa Romeo 800, of which it took its place. The loading capacity was increased to 9 tonnes. A three-axis version was also available.

Alfa Romeo 950 
By the mid-1950s the Model 900 was updated and became known as the Model 950. The main difference between two models is small windows behind the front doors of the cab. The 950 was produced until 1958, when it was replaced by the entirely-new Mille.

References 

Alfa Romeo trucks
World War II military vehicles
Military trucks of Italy
Military vehicles introduced from 1940 to 1944
Vehicles introduced in 1940